The Fleet Air Arm Museum is devoted to the history of British naval aviation. It has an extensive collection of military and civilian aircraft, aero engines, models of aircraft and Royal Navy ships (especially aircraft carriers), and paintings and drawings related to naval aviation. It is located on RNAS Yeovilton airfield, and the museum has viewing areas where visitors can watch military aircraft (especially helicopters) take off and land.

Exhibits
The museum's  main  display is divided into four areas:

Hall 1

This hall contains a display about the development of naval aviation from the early days of airships and fabric-covered wooden biplanes to modern jet aircraft and helicopters, including the front section of the fuselage of Short 184 8359, built locally by Westland Aircraft in Yeovil and flown at the Battle of Jutland in 1916 before being put on display at the Imperial War Museum, where it was damaged during the Second World War when the museum was hit by a bomb.  It is displayed in an unrestored condition.
 
Currently 2021 contains the following aircraft:
 Short S.27 (replica). An aircraft similar to this was used to make the first takeoff from a moving ship in 1912.
 Short 184 8359
 Sopwith Baby N2078
 Supermarine Walrus L2301, one of the aircraft flown by the Irish Air Corps before being bought back by the Fleet Air Arm after the war for use as a training aircraft.
 Westland Dragonfly HR.5 VX595
 Westland Lynx HAS.3 XZ699
 Westland Wessex HU.5 XS508
 Westland Sea King HAS.6 XV663 "Banana split".

Hall 2

Mainly devoted to the Second World War, with a side room containing a Kamikaze exhibit, which contains a Yokosuka MXY7 Ohka II (BAPC 58), models of Japanese aircraft and final letters from Kamikaze pilots. Two aircraft from the Korean War are also displayed. By the entrance to Hall 3 there is a collection of models of British aircraft carriers, illustrating the history of aircraft carrier design.

The aircraft on display include:
 de Havilland Sea Vampire I LZ551 the third prototype
 de Havilland Sea Vampire T.22 XA127 (pod only)
 Fairey Fulmar N1854: Two-seat fighter. This is the  Fulmar prototype, the only surviving example out of the 800 built. 
 Fairey Swordfish II P4139
 North American Harvard III EX976: American trainer. 
 Grumman Hellcat KE209: American single-seat fighter
 Supermarine Seafire F17 SX137: Naval version of the Supermarine Spitfire 
 Hawker Sea Fury FB.11 WJ231 :Post-war single-seat piston-engined fighter  
Grumman Avenger ECM.6B XB446: American torpedo bomber/reconnaissance
 Grumman Martlet AL246
 Vought Corsair KD431: this has had subsequent repaints removed to expose the original 1944 finish.
Yokosuka MXY7 Ohka II BAPC 58: Japanese Kamikaze aircraft designed to be carried to its target by a converted medium bomber. 
MiG 15: Russian jet fighter.
Westland Dragonfly HR.5 "WN493"

Hall 3

Instead of a traditional museum hall, the whole hall has been converted into a mock-up of the fleet carrier  as it would have appeared in the 1970s.  The entrance to this hall is by a simulated Wessex helicopter ride from Hall 2.  The hall itself is a simulation of a section of the flight deck of HMS Ark Royal and aircraft are displayed as if they are on the deck.  Two large screens show the takeoff and landing of aircraft such as Blackburn Buccaneers and McDonnell Douglas F-4 Phantom IIs.  There is also a series of rooms simulating the carrier's island.

The aircraft include:
 Blackburn Buccaneer S.1 XN957
 Fairey Gannet COD.4 XA466
 Supermarine Scimitar F.1 XD317/112/R
 de Havilland Sea Vixen FAW.2 XS590/131/E
 Hawker Siddeley Buccaneer S.2B XV333
 McDonnell Douglas Phantom FG.1 XT596
 Supermarine Attacker F.1 WA473/102/J
 de Havilland Sea Venom FAW.21 WW138
 Hawker Sea Hawk FGA.6 WV856
 Westland Wessex HU.5 XT482
 Westland Wessex HU.5 XT769

Hall 4

The aircraft on display:
 BAC 221 WG774: Also built as part of the Concorde programme, to explore the high-speed characteristics of the ogival delta wing. 
 BAC Concorde G-BSST The second Concorde to fly and the first British-built example. It was flown to Yeovilton in March 1976 and opened to the public in July of that year. It has been on display ever since.
 Sea Harrier FRS.1 XZ493
 Bristol Scout D  N5419 (reproduction): Displayed without any of the fabric covering, originally powered with a vintage Le Rhone 9C rotary when flown in the USA
 Handley Page HP.115 XP980: built  to explore the performance of low a delta wings at low speeds.
 Hawker Siddeley P.1127, built as part of the development process that led to the Hawker Siddeley Harrier and Sea Harrier.
 BAe Harrier GR.9 ZD433
 Westland Sea King HC.4 ZA298
 Westland Lynx HAS.3 XZ720

Other displays
In addition to the four main exhibition halls, there are a number of smaller displays. These include:
 A section devoted to the Battle of Taranto, the Fleet Air Arm's most celebrated exploit in World War II. The display includes a Fairey Swordfish, which can also be seen from the link between halls 1 and 2.
 The "Merlin Experience", which explains modern anti-submarine techniques.

Reserve Collection
The museum's collection includes a number of aircraft which are currently being restored and are not on display, although public access is allowed at least once a year. These are housed in Cobham Hall, a climate controlled building across the road from the museum.
 
Aircraft include:

Engines on display

The museum possesses a number of aero engines located throughout the halls.
Alvis Leonides
Armstrong Siddeley Cheetah
Bristol Centaurus
Bristol Mercury
Bristol Siddeley BS100
Clerget 9B
Bristol Siddeley Pegasus
de Havilland Gipsy Major
de Havilland Gipsy Queen
Rolls-Royce Avon
Rolls-Royce Nene
Rolls-Royce Merlin
Rolls-Royce/Snecma Olympus 593
Sunbeam Gurkha
Wright R-1820

Other activities

Restoration
The museum also carries out various restoration projects. the last project was a Corsair KD 431 which in the summer of 2006 was unveiled as it would have appeared in 1944. Presently  the projects underway are for a Fairey Barracuda and a Gloster Sea Gladiator. Visitors can see into (but not enter) the restoration workshop between Hall 3 and Hall 4.

Archives
The Fleet Air Arm Museum is the home to an archive of material related to naval aviation.

Visitor facilities

The museum's shop has the most extensive selection  of naval merchandise in the area, including various themed books and documentaries such as Sailor.

There is an outside adventure playground for children in the museum's grounds and two cafés.

See also

Naval aviation museums
Aeronauticum, German naval aviation museum, Nordholz
Fleet Air Arm Museum (Australia), Australian museum of naval aviation, Nowra, New South Wales
National Naval Aviation Museum, United States museum of naval aviation, Naval Air Station Pensacola, Florida
Naval Aviation Museum (India), Indian naval aviation museum, Goa, India
Patuxent River Naval Air Museum, United States museum of naval aviation RDT&E, Naval Air Station Patuxent River, Lexington Park, Maryland 
Shearwater Aviation Museum, Canadian naval aviation museum, Sheerwater, Nova Scotia.

Other
List of aerospace museums
List of museums in Somerset

References

Citations

Bibliography

External links

Aerospace museums in England
Military aviation museums in England
Naval museums in England
Museums in Somerset
Fleet Air Arm